Mieczysław Tarnawski (12 October 1924 – 12 September 1997) was a Polish film and stage actor.

Work
He passed an actor exam in 1959 and played in the following venues:
 Teatr im. Stefana Jaracza in Olsztyn and Elbląg (1960),
 Teatr Wybrzeże in Gdańsk (1960–1964),
 Bałtycki Teatr Dramatyczny im. Juliusza Słowackiego w Koszalin and Słupsk (1965),
 Teatr Dramatyczny im. Aleksandra Węgierki w Białystok (1966–1967),
 Teatru Ziemi Pomorskiej in Grudziądz (1967),
 Teatr Polski in Bielsko-Biała (1968–1983),
 Teatr Polski in Bydgoszcz (1983–1989).

Selected filmography
 Ostatni kurs (1963)
 Barbara i Jan, Episode No. 7 Willa na przedmieściu  (1964)
 Sposób bycia (1965)

References

External links
 
 Photos from Ostatni kurs on Fototeka's webpage

1924 births
1997 deaths
Polish male film actors
Polish male stage actors
20th-century Polish male actors